This page article all power stations in North Macedonia.

Hydroelectric

Wind

Thermal

See also 
 List of power stations in Europe
 List of largest power stations in the world

References 

North Macedonia
 
Power stations